Blue Valley North High School is a public high school located in Overland Park, Kansas, United States, serving students in grades 9–12. The school is one of the five high schools operated by Blue Valley USD 229 school district.  The school colors are navy blue and silver.  The current enrollment is approximately 1,550 students.  The principal is Tyson Ostroski.

Blue Valley North is a member of the Kansas State High School Activities Association and offers a variety of sports programs. Athletic teams compete in the 6A Division and are known as the "Mustangs". Extracurricular activities are also offered in the form of performing arts, school publications, and clubs.

History
Blue Valley North High School was established in 1986 in order to help educate students due to the rapid development of Overland Park, Kansas.

Academics

Blue Valley North was awarded the Blue Ribbon Award in the 1990–1991 academic year, one of the most successful years for the school. Blue Valley North won the award again in the 2007–2008 academic year. The Blue Ribbon Award recognizes public and private schools which perform at high levels or have made significant academic improvements.

The U.S. News & World Report ranks Blue Valley North as the best high school (#1) in the State of Kansas, a distinction it also received in 2016 and 2017.  The Washington Post has identified Blue Valley North High School as one of "America's Most Challenging High Schools," ranking it third in the State of Kansas in 2016 and 2017, and second in years 2011 through 2014.

Extracurricular activities

Athletics
The Mustangs compete in the Eastern Kansas League (EKL) and are classified as a 6A school, the largest classification in Kansas according to the Kansas State High School Activities Association. Throughout its history, Blue Valley North has won several state championships in various sports. Many graduates have gone on to participate in Division I, Division II, and Division III athletics. The Blue Valley North Mustangs are considered rivals with the Blue Valley Northwest Huskies. The two schools, along with Blue Valley West High School, share the District Athletic Complex located on the corner of 135th and Switzer as a home stadium for football, soccer, and baseball games. The Mustangs also compete against the rest of the Blue Valley High Schools, the nearby Shawnee Mission School District, and the Olathe School District.

State Championships

* championships shared with Blue Valley High School

Performing arts

Vocal music
Blue Valley North has five choirs:
Concert Choir, Women's Chorale, Chorale, and Chamber Singers.

Forensics
The forensics team at North has won some outstanding titles.  In Spring 2009, the BVN Forensics team won first place in the state out of 28 other 6A schools. In the National qualifying tournaments, nearly every first and second place slot went to Blue Valley North.  Also, in Spring 2010, the BVN Forensics team won first place in state for 6A schools. As of July 1, 2015, the forensics team is currently ranked first in Kansas and sixth in the nation.

Robotics
In 2008, FIRST Robotics Team 2410, the Metal Mustangs Robotics Team was formed. That season, they competed at two regionals, the Greater Kansas City regional and winning the Rookie All-Star award from St. Louis, which granted the team attendance to the FIRST World Championships that year. In their 2010 season, they again took home multiple awards, being finalists at the Greater Kansas City regional and then becoming the number one seeded robot at the Oklahoma Regional and winning the competition. They then competed at the 2010 World Championships, and finished in the upper half of their division. In the fall of 2010, the team moved to the Center For Advanced Professional Studies facility.

Notable alumni
 Todd Bosley, actor
 Casey Crawford, former professional basketball player
 Jeffrey Fisher, U.S. Supreme Court litigator
 Andy Gruenebaum, former professional goalkeeper for Sporting Kansas City of Major League Soccer
 Harry Higgs, professional golfer
 Jon Kempin, professional goalkeeper for LA Galaxy of Major League Soccer
 Graham Mertz, college football quarterback for the Florida Gators of the [SEC]
 Frances Silva, former professional midfielder for FC Kansas City of the National Women's Soccer League
 Eric Sock, professional tennis player
 Jack Sock, professional tennis player, winner of a gold and bronze medal in the 2016 Summer Olympics

See also
 List of high schools in Kansas
 List of unified school districts in Kansas
Other high schools in Blue Valley USD 229 school district
 Blue Valley High School in Stilwell
 Blue Valley Northwest High School in Overland Park
 Blue Valley West High School in Overland Park
 Blue Valley Southwest High School in Overland Park
 Blue Valley Academy in Overland Park

References

External links

 School Website
 Blue Valley USD 229 school district
 District School Boundary Map

Public high schools in Kansas
Educational institutions established in 1986
Education in Overland Park, Kansas
Schools in Johnson County, Kansas
1986 establishments in Kansas